Billy Joe Adcock was a basketball player for the Vanderbilt Commodores. A prominent forward, he was the first player to be awarded a basketball scholarship by the school. He was also the school's first All-American basketball selection, by the Sporting News in 1950. Adcock retired as Vanderbilt's all-time leading scorer. He attended West High School in Nashville, where he was a three-year letterman in football and baseball as well as basketball.

Early years
Adcock was born in Evansville, Indiana, but his family soon moved to Jackson, Tennessee.

References

American men's basketball players
Basketball players from Indiana
Basketball players from Nashville, Tennessee
Fort Wayne Pistons draft picks
Forwards (basketball)
Guards (basketball)
People from Jackson, Tennessee
Sportspeople from Evansville, Indiana
Vanderbilt Commodores men's basketball players